Balada Shalawat (Ballad of Salah) is an Islamic religious album released in 2010 by Gita Gutawa. It was arranged, orchestrated and produced by Erwin Gutawa and published by Sony Music Indonesia. Written as a way to "bring people to pray and praise Allah", the album included two new songs and six covers or rearrangements. The proceeds from album sales were to be donated to the poor.

Writing
According to Erwin Gutawa, Balada Shalawat was written to bring Allah's word to the public through music, which the orchestral music serving to "bring people to pray and praise His greatness". He also said that it was made as a way to give back to the community after the commercial success of Gita's previous albums, Gita Gutawa and Harmoni Cinta.

Production
Balada Shalawat was arranged, orchestrated, and produced by Erwin Gutawa, Gita Gutawa's father. It was recorded in Aluna Studio. Recording took one year, although it was not intensive.

Gita collaborated with her father in writing two songs, "Lelaki Sempurna" and "Kisah 8 Dirham". Other songs were covers or rereleases. "Ketika Tangan dan Kaki Berkata" was originally released sung by Chrisye for Kala Cinta Menggoda and "Selamat Idul Fitri" had previously been sung in duet with Hadad Alwi for a concert.

The songs "Lelaki Sempurna" and "Kisah 8 Dirham" were both inspired by Muhammad. "Lelaki Sempurna" is based on Muhammad's personality, "truthful, trustworthy, smart, and diligent". "Kisah 8 Dirham tells of a trip made by Muhammad to a market, where he gladly donates all of his money to the poor and is thus unable to purchase new clothes. It was written after Gita heard Uztad Fikri's retelling of the story.

Prior to recording the Arabic-language "Balada Shalawat", Gita was coached by an Ustad, a respected teacher of Islam, in the proper pronunciation.

The song "Ketika Tangan dan Kaki Berkata" was based on the Islamic view of the Last Judgment and verse 65 of Surah Ya Sin, which reads:"Today we shall seal the mouths of the infidels, and their hands will speak to us, and their feet will bear witness to what (evils) they used to earn."

Two different orchestras provided music. The Prague Philharmonic Orchestra played on "Balada Shalawat", "Ketika Tangan dan Kaki Berkata", and "Selamat Idul Fitri". The Victorian Philharmonic Orchestra provided music for "Salam Ramadhan".

Track listing

Styles
"Ketika Tangan dan Kaki Berkata" is accompanied by orchestral music that, together with Gita's soprano voice, "emphasises [its] depth of meaning". "Balada Shalawat" is accompanied by more classical music.

Release and reception
Balada Shalawat was released in August 2010, during Ramadhan, with all profits from the sales to be donated to the destitute. "Lelaki Sempurna" and "Kisah 8 Dirham" were released as singles.

A music video was produced for "Balada Shalawat", with a Ramadhan theme. It was directed by Rizal Montavani and shot in Kota Tua, Jakarta.

Notes

References

2010 albums
Indonesian-language albums
Arabic-language albums
Islamic music albums by Indonesian artists
Gita Gutawa albums